Behind may refer to:
 Behind (album), a 1992 album by Superior
 Behind (Australian rules football), a method of scoring in Australian rules football, awarding one point
 "Behind" (song), a 2008 single by Flanders
 Behind, a slang term for the buttocks